Drury Cottage is a historic cure cottage located at Saranac Lake in the town of Harrietstown, Franklin County, New York.  It was built in 1910 and is a -story, frame dwelling set atop a cut stone foundation and surmounted by a gable roof clad in asphalt shingles.  The front facade is dominated by a 2-story, three-bay cobblestone porch.

It was listed on the National Register of Historic Places in 1992.

References

Houses on the National Register of Historic Places in New York (state)
Houses completed in 1910
Houses in Franklin County, New York
American Craftsman architecture in New York (state)
National Register of Historic Places in Franklin County, New York